The 2015–16 Magyar Kupa, known as  for sponsorship reasons, was the 58th edition of the tournament.

Participating teams 
The following 51 teams qualified for the competition:

Map

Schedule
The rounds of the 2015–16 competition are scheduled as follows:

Matches 
A total of 51 matches will take place, starting with Preliminary Round on 31 August 2015 and culminating with the final on 17 April 2016 at the Főnix Csarnok in Debrecen.

Preliminary round
The first round ties are scheduled for 31 August – 8 September 2015.

|-
!colspan="3" style="background:#ccccff;"|31 August

|-
!colspan="3" style="background:#ccccff;"|2 September

|-
!colspan="3" style="background:#ccccff;"|6 September

|-
!colspan="3" style="background:#ccccff;"|8 September

|}

Round 1
The first round ties are scheduled for 2–16 September 2015.

|-
!colspan="3" style="background:#ccccff;"|2 September

|-
!colspan="3" style="background:#ccccff;"|4 September

|-
!colspan="3" style="background:#ccccff;"|9 September

|-
!colspan="3" style="background:#ccccff;"|15 September

|-
!colspan="3" style="background:#ccccff;"|16 September

|}

Round 2
The second round ties are scheduled for 29 September – 8 October 2015.

|-
!colspan="3" style="background:#ccccff;"|29 September

|-
!colspan="3" style="background:#ccccff;"|30 September

|-
!colspan="3" style="background:#ccccff;"|7 October

|-
!colspan="3" style="background:#ccccff;"|8 October

|}

Round 3
The third round ties are scheduled for 14–21 October 2015.

|-
!colspan="3" style="background:#ccccff;"|14 October

|-
!colspan="3" style="background:#ccccff;"|20 October

|-
!colspan="3" style="background:#ccccff;"|21 October

|}

Round 4
The fourth round ties are scheduled for 1–15 December 2015.

|-
!colspan="3" style="background:#ccccff;"|1 December

|-
!colspan="3" style="background:#ccccff;"|2 December

|-
!colspan="3" style="background:#ccccff;"|16 December

|}

Quarter-finals (Round 5)
The fifth round ties are scheduled for 3 February 2016.

|-
!colspan="3" style="background:#ccccff;"|3 February

|-
!colspan="3" style="background:#ccccff;"|17 February

|}

Final four
The final four will be held on 16 and 17 April 2016 at the Főnix Csarnok in Debrecen.

{{Round4-with third
|RD1 = Semi-finals
|RD2 = Final
|Consol= Third place
| team-width=190
| score-width=40

|16 April, 12:00| MOL-Pick Szeged|33| Mezőkövesdi KC|27
|16 April, 14:00| Balatonfüredi KSE|21| MVM Veszprém|40

|17 April, 16:00| MOL-Pick Szeged|24 | MVM Veszprém (pen.)|24 

|17 April, 13:45| Mezőkövesdi KC|25| Balatonfüredi KSE|27
}}

AwardsMVP:  Aron Pálmarsson (MVM Veszprém)Best Goalkeeper:  José Manuel Sierra (MOL-Pick Szeged)

Semi-finals

Third placeFinal'''

Final standings

See also
 2015–16 Nemzeti Bajnokság I

References

External links
 Hungarian Handball Federaration 

Magyar Kupa Men